Tasly is a Chinese pharmaceutical company based in the city of Tianjin. It was established in 1994 and is notably producing traditional Chinese medicines.

It has a turnover of 4 billion US dollars, 10,000 employees and is listed on the Shanghai Stock Exchange.

In 2009, Chinese pharmacologist Li Lianda claimed that a key product made by Tasly was unsafe. Tasly sued Li in 2013, alleging that Li's claim was baseless and was motivated by his financial and employment relations with Guangzhou Pharmaceutical, a direct competitor of Tasly. In September 2014, the Tianjin High People's Court ruled in favour of Tasly and ordered Li to issue an apology and pay Tasly 300,000 yuan in compensation.

In February 2017, Tasly announced plans to form a joint venture with American multi-level marketing company Herbalife.

See also 
 Pharmaceutical industry in China
 Tianshili Station

Notes and references

External links 
 

Manufacturing companies based in Tianjin
Chinese companies established in 1994
Pharmaceutical companies of China
Companies listed on the Shanghai Stock Exchange
Traditional Chinese medicine
Chinese brands
Pharmaceutical companies established in 1994